Tohfa Mohabbat Ka is a 1988 Bollywood drama film directed by Ram Govind and produced by Maya Govind.

Cast
 Raj Kumar
 Kimi Katkar
 Preeti Ganguli
 Johny Lever
 Hema Malini - Herself
 Gulshan Grover
 Bharat Kapoor

Music
"Dhum Titak Dhum Dhum" (Gori O Gori) - Asha Bhosle, Anup Jalota
"Prem Ka Granth Padhaoon" - Parveen Sultana
"Pyar Se Pyara Kuchh Bhi Nahi" - Anuradha Paudwal, Anup Jalota
"Sun Sun Aye Sunita" - Asha Bhosle, Anup Jalota
"Suno Brij Ki Kahani" - Alka Yagnik, Anup Jalota, Chandrani Mukherjee
"Tujhe Bhulne Ki Koshish" (Aa Dekh Teri Radha) - Asha Bhosle

External links

References

1980s Hindi-language films
1988 films
Indian drama films